KLFN (106.5 FM, "106.5 The Train") is a radio station licensed to Sunburg, Minnesota.  The station broadcasts a classic hits format and is owned by Lakeland Broadcasting Company.

References

External links
KLFN's website

Classic hits radio stations in the United States
Radio stations in Minnesota